Albert Wilkinson (3 November 1928 – 26 June 2011) was an English professional footballer who played as a winger.

Career
Born in Barnsley, Wilkinson signed for Bradford City as an amateur in 1950. He made 2 league appearances for the club, before joining Denaby United in 1951.  He later played for Halifax Town, Rotherham United and Chesterfield.

Sources

References

1929 births
2011 deaths
English footballers
Bradford City A.F.C. players
Denaby United F.C. players
Halifax Town A.F.C. players
Rotherham United F.C. players
Chesterfield F.C. players
English Football League players
Association football wingers